Frederick Huntington Gillett (October 16, 1851 – July 31, 1935) was an American politician who served in the Massachusetts state government and both houses of the U.S. Congress between 1879 and 1931, including six years as Speaker of the U.S. House of Representatives.

Early life 

Frederick H. Gillett was born in Westfield, Massachusetts, to Edward Bates Gillett (1817–1899) and Lucy Fowler Gillett (1830–1916). He graduated from Amherst College, where he was a member of the Alpha Delta Phi fraternity, in 1874 and Harvard Law School in 1877. He entered the practice of law in Springfield in 1877.

Career 

Gillett was the Assistant Attorney General of Massachusetts from 1879 to 1882. For two one-year terms he was a member of the Massachusetts House of Representatives. He was elected to the Fifty-third United States Congress in 1892.

A Republican, Gillett served in the United States House of Representatives from 1893 to 1925. On January 24, 1914, he introduced legislation to initiate the adoption of an Anti-Polygamy Amendment to the U.S. Constitution.

Republicans gained a net total of 24 seats in the 1918 elections, increasing the size of their majority in the House. Gillett was nominated by the Republican caucus for Speaker of the House in the upcoming 66th United States Congress. On May 19, 1919, Congress convened, and he was elected speaker, defeating the Democratic incumbent Champ Clark 228–172. Gillett was expected to exercise less control than his predecessor, since he was characterized by one reporter as someone who did not drink coffee in the morning "for fear it would keep him awake all day". He was reelected as speaker in 1921 and again in 1923.

In 1923, votes cast by the Progressive wing of the GOP resulted in multiple ballots as no Speaker candidate gained a majority. On the ninth ballot, after the Republican leadership agreed to Progressive procedural reforms, Gillet was eventually elected. This was the only time in the 20th century that the House failed to elect a Speaker during the first roll call, and the 14th time in history that election of the Speaker required multiple ballots. The previous occurrence was in 1859 for the 36th Congress, which elected William Pennington after 44 ballots. The next occurrence was in 2023 for the 118th Congress, which elected Kevin McCarthy after 15 ballots.

He decided to run for the United States Senate in 1924. He won the Republican primary easily over two other candidates and then narrowly defeated incumbent Senator David I. Walsh in the Republican landslide of November 1924 led by President Calvin Coolidge, a former governor of Massachusetts. Time magazine chose him for its November 17, 1924 cover. He served one term in the Senate from 1925 to 1931, and decided not to seek re-election in the face of a difficult primary challenge. In June 1930, he declined to state his position on prohibition or its repeal when queried by prohibition advocates.

Personal life 
On November 25, 1915, Gillett married Christine Rice Hoar, the widow of his former colleague in Congress, Rockwood Hoar. In 1934, he published a biography of George Frisbie Hoar, an earlier congressman and senator from Massachusetts, and his wife's father-in-law from her previous marriage.

During his time in Washington, Gillett spent his free time driving his 1926 Pontiac Coupe and playing golf in the morning. In retirement, he wintered in Pasadena, California. He died in a hospital in Springfield, Massachusetts, on July 31, 1935. Gillett was buried at Pine Hill Cemetery in Westfield.

Legacy 
As of 2022, Gillett is the most recent Speaker of the House to have also served in the U.S. Senate. At 31 years, 11 months, and 27 days, he was also the longest-tenured incumbent congressman to have ever been elected to the Senate until June 2013, when Representative Ed Markey (36 years, 8 months, and 13 days) was elected to the same Senate seat that Gillett previously held.

References

External links 
 Gillett Family Papers at the Amherst College Archives & Special Collections
 Rockwood Hoar Papers 
 Westfield Athenaeum Archives

1851 births
1935 deaths
Amherst College alumni
Republican Party members of the Massachusetts House of Representatives
Speakers of the United States House of Representatives
Harvard Law School alumni
Republican Party United States senators from Massachusetts
Republican Party members of the United States House of Representatives from Massachusetts
Deans of the United States House of Representatives
People from Westfield, Massachusetts